Natori may refer to:

Places
Natori, Miyagi, a city in northern Japan
Natori River, a river in northern Japan
Natori District, Miyagi, a former district in Miyagi Prefecture, Japan 
Natori Station, an East Japan Railway Company station

People with the surname
Atsushi Natori, Japanese soccer player
, Japanese speed skater
Josie Natori, fashion designer
Kaori Natori, Japanese singer and model
Takeshi Natori, Japanese soccer player
Natori Masatake, samurai

Other
Japanese cruiser Natori, a light cruiser of the Imperial Japan Navy
The Natori Company, a fashion company 

Japanese-language surnames